Hafodiwan is a hamlet in the  community of Llandysiliogogo, Ceredigion, Wales, which is 69.6 miles (112 km) from Cardiff and 186.6 miles (300.2 km) from London. Hafodiwan is represented in the Senedd by Elin Jones (Plaid Cymru) and is part of the Ceredigion constituency in the House of Commons.

References

See also
List of localities in Wales by population 

Villages in Ceredigion